Klousseh Agbozo (born 26 June 1994) is a Togolese footballer who plays as a centre-back for Olympique Béja and the Togo national team.

Career
Agbozo began his career with the Togolese side Dynamic Togolais, before moving to Olympique Béja on 1 November 2020. He debuted with Béja in a 2–2 Tunisian Ligue Professionnelle 1 tie with Stade Tunisien on 6 December 2020.

International career
Agbozo made his debut with the Togo national team in a 0–0 2020 African Nations Championship qualification tie with Benin on 28 July 2019.

References

External links
 
 

1994 births
Living people
Sportspeople from Lomé
Togolese footballers
Togo international footballers
Association football defenders
Olympique Béja players
Tunisian Ligue Professionnelle 1 players
Togolese expatriate footballers
Togolese expatriate sportspeople in Tunisia
Expatriate footballers in Tunisia
21st-century Togolese people